Riechedly Bazoer (born 12 October 1996) is a Dutch professional footballer of Curaçaoan descent who plays as a midfielder for Dutch club AZ.

Club career

Ajax 
Bazoer joined Ajax on a free from rival Eredivisie club PSV on 16 November 2012. He had been linked with a move to the Premier League with Arsenal, Chelsea, Manchester City and Newcastle United being mentioned, but opted to sign with Ajax instead. No transfer fee was necessary, as the young defender was under age. However it was declared by the KNVB that Bazoer would not be eligible for the first team of Ajax until after his 16th birthday. Unable to make his debut in the 2012–13 season for the first team due to the KNVB ruling, he played for Jong Ajax in the Beloften Eredivisie, as well as participating in the 2013 Copa Amsterdam with Ajax A1.

On 29 June 2013, he made his debut for Ajax during a pre-season friendly against SDC Putten. Bazoer came on as a second-half substitute, with the match ending in a 4–1 win in favour of Ajax. Bazoer made his professional debut in the Eerste Divisie for Jong Ajax, in the team's season opener against Telstar on 5 August 2013, a match they won 2–0 in the team's first ever match in the second division of Dutch football. On 4 September 2013 it was announced that Bazoer was amongst the 22 players who were registered by Frank de Boer for Ajax's 2013–14 UEFA Champions League campaign. On 15 February 2015, Bazoer scored his first goal for Ajax in a 4–2 win over FC Twente. On 19 February 2015, Bazoer made his full European debut in a 1–0 win over Legia Warsaw in the Europa League.

VfL Wolfsburg
On 14 December 2016, VfL Wolfsburg announced that Bazoer had signed a contract with the Lower Saxony club through 30 June 2021. The transfer went through in the following Winter Transfer period. The reported transfer fee was 12 million euro. He made his VfL Wolfsburg debut in the Bundesliga game versus TSG Hoffenheim on 12 February 2017.

Porto (loan)
On 31 August 2018, Bazoer was loaned to Primeira Liga side Porto on one-year loan. Bazoer did not featured in any league games for Porto due to injuries and lack of discipline which made him play with B team.

Utrecht (loan) 
On 7 January 2019, he joined Utrecht on loan until the end of the season.

Vitesse 
On 12 July 2019, he joined Vitesse on a permanent transfer from VfL Wolfsburg for an undisclosed amount. He signed a three-year deal. Bazoer made his debut for Vitesse on 3 August 2019 against former club Ajax. In the match, he scored a goal to put Vitesse ahead 2–1 before being sent off for two yellow cards as they were held to a 2–2 draw. On 24 October 2019, Bazoer was left out of the Vitesse squad until further notice due to his attitude. 

Under head coach Thomas Letsch, Bazoer would grow into a key player. The German manager of Vitesse positioned Bazoer in the position of centre-back, after advice by assistant coach Joseph Oosting. As Vitesse finished 4th in the league table in the 2020–21 season, Bazoer was voted "Player of the Season" by Dutch football magazine Voetbal International.

AZ Alkmaar 
On 1 August 2022, Bazoer joined AZ on a free transfer, signing a three-year contract.

International career

Youth
Bazoer has represented the Netherlands at various youth levels. He participated in the 2012 UEFA European Under-17 Championship, helping to contribute to the Netherlands' second consecutive continental title in that age group by defeating Germany 5–4 on penalties in the final, after extra time following a 1–1 deadlock.

On 4 January 2013, the Curaçao Football Federation expressed an interest in calling up Bazoer to represent the Curaçao U-20 team for the 2013 CONCACAF U-20 Championship in Mexico. Bazoer was eligible due to his age and heritage, and this would not have conflicted with his decision to play for the Netherlands given the player's age but the offer was turned down by his agents, and Bazoer remained in Amsterdam.

Senior
Bazoer received his first call up to the senior Netherlands team in October 2015 to replace the injured Davy Klaassen, and again on 6 November 2015 for friendlies against Wales and Germany. He made his senior debut as a late substitute against Wales on 13 November 2015. He was called up to the preliminary squad for the Curaçao national team for the 2021 CONCACAF Gold Cup.

Career statistics

Honours
Netherlands U17
 UEFA European Under-17 Championship: 2012

Individual
 Ajax Talent of the Year: 2016

References

External links

 Netherlands U17 stats at UEFA.com
 Netherlands U21 stats at OnsOranje

1996 births
Living people
Dutch footballers
Dutch people of Curaçao descent
Footballers from Utrecht (city)
Eredivisie players
Eerste Divisie players
Bundesliga players
Liga Portugal 2 players
USV Elinkwijk players
PSV Eindhoven players
AFC Ajax players
Jong Ajax players
VfL Wolfsburg players
FC Porto players
FC Porto B players
FC Utrecht players
SBV Vitesse players
Netherlands international footballers
Netherlands youth international footballers
Netherlands under-21 international footballers
Dutch expatriate footballers
Dutch expatriate sportspeople in Germany
Expatriate footballers in Germany
Dutch expatriate sportspeople in Portugal
Expatriate footballers in Portugal
Association football midfielders